Monsef Bakrar (born January 13, 2001 in Sétif) is an Algerian footballer who plays for NK Istra 1961 in the Croatian Football League.

On July 20, 2022, Bakrar signed a one-year contract with Istra.

References

External links
 

2001 births
Algeria under-23 international footballers
Algerian Ligue Professionnelle 1 players
Algerian footballers
Algerian expatriate footballers
Algerian expatriates in Croatia
Croatian Football League players
ES Sétif players
Expatriate footballers in Croatia
Living people
NK Istra 1961 players
People from Sétif
Footballers from Sétif